Frovold Lake is a lake in Swift County, in the U.S. state of Minnesota.

Frovold Lake was named for Knut P. Frovold, a pioneer settler.

See also
List of lakes in Minnesota

References

Lakes of Minnesota
Lakes of Swift County, Minnesota